Sexton Blake and the Hooded Terror is a 1938 British crime film directed by George King and starring George Curzon, Tod Slaughter and Greta Gynt. It was George Curzon's third and final outing as the fictional detective Sexton Blake.

Plot summary 
The film - described as the best in the Blake series of 1930s movies - features the character of Sexton Blake and his efforts to defeat a major crime organisation headed by Michael Larron, a 'sort of Moriarty figure'.

Cast 
George Curzon as Sexton Blake
Tod Slaughter as Michael Larron
Greta Gynt as Madamoiselle Julie
Tony Sympson as Tinker
Charles Oliver as Max Fleming
Marie Wright as Mrs. Bardell
David Farrar as Granite Grant
Norman Pierce as Inspector Bramley
H.B. Hallam as Monsieur Bertrand
Bradley Watts as Paul Duvall

Critical reception
Of the film's villain, Leonard Maltin concluded, "Slaughter plays it basically straight in this passable low-budget outing"; while Dennis Schwartz wrote, "Tod Slaughter is a trip as the perverse villain drooling over both stamps and Julie (Greta Gynt), and decked out when meeting gang members in a spiffy black robe with a snake embroidered on its front and a fashionable KKK-like hood. Like Vincent Price, Slaughter can make a not too original low-budget B film fun to watch."

References

External links 

1938 films
1938 crime films
British black-and-white films
Films directed by George King
British detective films
Films set in Hong Kong
Films set in London
Films set in England
Films set in Paris
Films shot at Shepperton Studios
Films scored by Jack Beaver
British crime films
Films based on British novels
Films based on crime novels
Sexton Blake films
1930s English-language films
1930s British films